David Hickey (born 12 June 1991) is an Australian rugby union player. He is currently the captain of the Sydney Stars team in the National Rugby Championship, and he previously played for the New South Wales Waratahs.

Hickey was born in Coonabarabran in the Central West of New South Wales. He attended St Joseph's College in Sydney where he played rugby for the first XV in 2008. Hickey joined the Sydney University rugby club, and was a member of the University's Shute Shield premiership-winning team in 2012.

In 2013 he played for the New South Wales Waratahs against the Crusaders. He signed on to play for the Sydney Stars for the inaugural season of the National Rugby Championship in 2014, and was named as captain of the team for the 2015 season.

References

External links
It's Rugby stats
Sydney Stars profile

1991 births
New South Wales Waratahs players
Rugby union flankers
Rugby union players from Sydney
Living people